A push stick, push shoe, or push block is a safety device used when working with stationary routers, jointers, or power saws such as table saws or bandsaws. The purpose of a push stick is to help the user safely maneuver a workpiece, keeping it flat against a machine table or fence while it is being cut.

Types of push sticks
There are several different categories of push sticks, and many people adapt their own designs. 
 Push shoes are push devices categorized by a long section to gain more control over the workpiece, and are typically "L" shaped.
 Push stick can be a general term to refer to all push devices, or to a specific type categorized by a long handle with a notch in the end.

 Push blocks typically are made from a thick block of wood with a handle and a hook on the back to hold onto the workpiece.
 Push pads typically consist of one or two handles and a flat pad with a rubber underside to increase friction with the workpiece. They are typically used with jointers and router tables. 
 Microjig's GRR-Ripper is a hybrid push device that combines characteristics of a push block with a push pad. It uses an adjustable base which allows it to straddle a table saw blade or be used as a push pad.

References

Woodworking jigs
Woodworking tools